Essex in Ireland refers to the military campaign pursued in Ireland in 1599 by Robert Devereux, 2nd Earl of Essex, during the Nine Years War.

In 1598, Queen Elizabeth I of England had been troubled over the choice of a military commander for Ireland, at a time when two factions dominated her court - one led by Essex, the other by her principal secretary, Sir Robert Cecil. In the following year Essex found himself with no choice but to offer his services, which the Queen accepted. The ensuing campaign failed, and Essex returned in disgrace to England, where he made a treasonable challenge to Crown authority. He was convicted and put to death in 1601.

Appointment of Essex
In the 1590s Essex was especially popular in London, where he was considered a pillar of Protestantism. At the height of the Anglo-Spanish war (1585–1604) he pushed an offensive strategy, supporting the Dutch rebels and French Huguenots against their Catholic enemy. But even as he championed maritime attacks on Spain and outright war against the Irish rebel O'Neill, the broad alliance against Spain was broken by the decision of King Henry IV of France to sue for peace.

The Queen's principal secretary, Lord Burghley (father of Cecil and once guardian of Essex), strongly opposed this strategy, preferring peace and a steady hand in Ireland. In April 1598 he confronted Essex in the Council chamber for the last time. According to the chronicler William Camden, Essex denounced peace as dishonourable, but Burghley interrupted, saying, "he breathed forth nothing but war, slaughter and blood", and pointed to the text of his prayerbook: "Bloodthirsty and deceitful men shall not live out half their days."

In the summer, during the Council debate over the appointment of the next military commander for Ireland, Essex turned his back on the Queen, and she lost her temper, striking him across the head. He laid his hand on the hilt of his sword, but was held back by the Lord Admiral. Before leaving the chamber Essex (again, according to Camden) said, "he neither could nor would put up so great an affront and indignity, neither would he have taken it at King Henry the Eighth his hands". Tradition has it that he also called the Queen, "as crooked in her disposition as in her carcass".

His credit greatly reduced, he withdrew from Court - but the Queen's problems soon became more complex: in early August Burghley died; ten days later her army in Ireland suffered a stunning defeat at the Battle of the Yellow Ford; and a few weeks later Phillip II, the king of Spain. died.

The faction fight resumed, and Essex and the younger Cecil each tried to diminish the other's influence by proposing the Irish appointment (and therefore removal from Court) of members of the opposing faction. Once the list of candidates was exhausted the Cecil faction named Essex as the only remaining option, and he felt bound to offer his services. On December 30 the Queen formally opted for him, not merely as her deputy in Ireland but as Lord Lieutenant, and Essex announced his determination to beat O'Neill in the field.

Powers
On Twelfth Night Essex danced with the Queen at a party for the Danish ambassador. She had misgivings over the details of the campaign, but preparations were settled by the first week of March 1599. Letters patent were passed releasing Essex from the debts incurred by his father in the Irish service, and he received his appointment on 12 March, with power to pardon the rebel leader of his life upon submission and to confer knighthoods (but only where deserved by service and sufficient living).

The army was fixed at 16,000 troops, with 1,300 horse. Among the troops were 2,000 veterans from the Netherlands campaign, led by Henry Dowcra, which it was proposed to distribute in garrisons. The plan provided for reinforcements of 2,000 troops from England every three months to make up for expected losses, and a regular postal service was established between Dublin and London via Holyhead. Essex also had command of a squadron of five warships with an assortment of fly-boats, which was intended for a landing at Lough Foyle in the north. An emergency rendez-vous for the squadron was appointed at Berehaven (or Baltimore) in the southern province of Munster, in the event of Spanish aggression. Ultimately the ships were confined to southern waters and played no part in the northern campaign.

The army was the largest ever sent to Ireland, and was fully equipped with munitions, clothing, artillery, victuals, and ships. The expected cost of the campaign was put at £290,000 per annum, twice that of Elizabeth's Netherlands campaign. The Irish enemy was supplied from Spain and Scotland, and its troops estimated at 20-30,000, with up to half operating in the northern province of Ulster, where the crown's authority was confined to a few inland forts supplied by defended towns in the east.

Departure
Essex departed London on 27 March 1599. Prayers were offered in the churches for his success, and he was cheered on in the sunshine for four miles through a double line of citizens, until it began to rain and hail. With him were the noblemen Blount and Southampton, whom Essex appointed against the queen's wishes.

On April 5 Essex waited at Hilbre, an island at the mouth of the river Dee, for favourable winds in foggy conditions. A week later he sailed from Beaumaris after impatiently riding over Penmaen Mawr - "the worst way and in the extremest wet that I have endured" - while bidding his ships to meet him. After a violent passage he reached Dublin on April 15 and was sworn into office the same day, when the Archbishop of Dublin preached a notable sermon.

The campaign had already suffered a blow in January on the death at Dublin of Sir Richard Bingham, a veteran commander of the Irish wars who commanded 5,000 troops from England. After Essex's arrival there was a further blow on the death of the young Earl of Kildare, who was set to join the campaign when his ship foundered in the Irish Sea and he was drowned along with eighteen Irish noblemen.

In his first week in Ireland Essex mounted a lavish pageant of English chivalry during the Garter Feast at Dublin on St George's Day, April 23. It was a pointed display of the values he felt were ignored at Elizabeth's Court. In London the Queen had chosen a muted version of the same ceremony, owing to the hardships of the war, and on hearing the reports from Dublin she granted the valuable mastership of wards to Cecil rather than the Earl. There was more humiliation for Essex when he rode north to Drogheda to inspect the famous 1,200 strong Flanders regiment, now commanded by Arthur Chichester. Essex charged the parading troops with his mounted staff, but they chose not to see the joke and stood firm, forcing him to pull his horse back as he was pricked in the backside with a pike.

Campaign preparations
The grand strategy favoured at Dublin, of attacking by land and sea simultaneously, was probably impossible with English resources, given the rumours of a fresh Armada from Spain and the need to keep warships in southern waters. The amphibious expedition to establish a northern base at Lough Foyle was abandoned, and the Dublin Council switched from an immediate attack on O'Neill and his confederate, Hugh Roe O'Donnell, when it became clear the strategy would fail through want of forage, cattle, and draught-horses. But this advice was declined by the Privy Council at London, which settled on a straight attack north into Ulster.

The Dublin Council may have been right: O'Neill bore out its fears by stripping food and horses from the lands bordering the Pale (an area around Dublin traditionally loyal to crown government). The rebel leader then encouraged a rebellion by the White Knight in the southern province of Munster, while O'Donnell moved into the western province of Connacht, with the expectation O'Neill would push south to join with the White Knight. War was in preparation at every point of the compass.

The Dublin Council advised Essex to attack O'Neill's confederates in the east, around the Pale, where the rebels were reckoned at 3,000 plus 800 mercenaries sent from Ulster. Essex seems to have taken that advice, ordering 5,000 troops into garrisons along the border of the Pale. To counter the White Knight he reinforced Cork on the south coast, and more troops were ordered into Munster for Sir Thomas Norris (acting president of that province) and into Kilkenny for the Earl of Ormond. In the west the army of the President of Connacht, Sir Conyers Clifford, was increased to 3,000. Conditions on the ground had set Essex in opposition to the Council in London: he put the threat from the north on hold and chose, instead, to head south and subdue Ireland in a roundabout tour - through the Pale into Munster, and heading back to Dublin through south Leinster.

Southern campaign
Essex set out from Dublin on May 9 to muster his army in the champion fields of Kildare, the Curragh. He marched south, taking the castle of Athy, and was harried by the O'Mores as he passed beyond the Pale. He relieved the fort of Maryborough, and the first significant engagement came in the second week of May at the pass of Cashel in Queens County. The pass was wooded and boggy, with a plashed trench at either end. At the head of his advance were 40 shot and 20 swordsmen. In the face of rebel resistance the calivermen moved to point blank range and the swordsmen jumped into the trenches on the flanks; the vanguard moved through the calivermen in a frontal assault and pressed through to open country, where they halted until the whole column had joined them. Essex was said to have flown like lightning between the vanguard, battle, and rearguard. The English admitted to the loss of three officers and several men although the Irish claimed 500 were killed. The rebels captured many feathered helmets, and the battle became known as The Pass of the Plumes. According to Geoffrey Keating's History of Ireland, "in the year 1599, (Owney Mac Rory Óg O'More) cut off a great number of the troops of the Earl of Essex, in a defile in their progress through Leinster, at a place called from that circumstance Bearna-Cleitigh, signifying the Pass of Plumes, from the great quantity of plumes left there, which were worn in the helmets of the English knights who were slain."

On May 18 Essex marched south to Kilkenny with two-thirds of his force. The streets of the city were strewn in welcome with green herbs and rushes, and Essex endured some lively orations from the local dignitaries. After meeting with Thomas Norris he departed on May 22 with 2,500 foot and 300 horse and was received with jubilation in the town of Clonmel. Two miles below the town, on the river Suir, the castle of Derrylare was surrendered, and Essex then fixed his sights on Cahir Castle, the strongest fortress in Ireland.

Essex had accused Lord Cahir, whose brother had custody of the castle, of collusion with the White Knight. Upon the failure of a parley for the surrender of the castle the English took forceful action: in a cannonade lasting two days the curtain wall was breached and the garrison fled. Essex entered the castle on May 29 (see Siege of Cahir Castle).

Essex marched west to Limerick city, where he was well received on June 4. At this point the army was joined by a large train of baggage porters, which outnumbered the fighting men two-to-one and remained a drain on resources throughout the campaign. At Askeaton (centre of resistance to the crown in the Desmond rebellion 15 years earlier) the army was revictualled after an encounter at Adare with the Sugán Earl, a pretender to the Earldom of Desmond who had shown himself with 2-3,000 men.

Essex realised the Munster rebels would not allow themselves to be trapped between his army and the western seaboard and decided to march south in an effort to draw them into battle. At Kilmallock he consulted the president, Thomas Norris, but conditions had begun to deteriorate, and it was reported that the soldiers "went so coldly on" that Essex had to reproach their baseness. There was no money, no magazine, no remnant of victual from the crown stores, and scarce enough cows to supply the army for two days, ammunition only for three. The army marched further south while Essex went to Mallow on a mission to procure supplies. He rejoined his men with a MacCarthy ally, but by the time he entered the heart of Desmond country the Sugán Earl and the rest of the rebels had gone into the field and were beyond reach.

Essex forded the river Blackwater at Affane, where he held a council of war in his tent, allowing Norris 1,100 foot and a company of horse to pursue the war in Munster. He marched unhindered eastward through Lord Power's country to Waterford City, where he was received with two Latin orations and a joyful concourse of people on June 21. The army was ferried across the river, from Munster to Leinster, an operation that took a frustrating length of time, and Essex left Waterford on June 22.

Return to Dublin
The way to Dublin was north by Wicklow, where the English commander Henry Harrington had been heavily defeated at the Battle of Deputy's Pass near Wicklow on May 29 by the rebel Phelim MacFeagh O'Byrne. Essex marched over the river Slaney with 1,200 fighting men and a host of churls and horseboys, choosing to approach by the coast rather than risk the foothills. Along the way his men torched villages and houses, until confronted by O'Byrne with 1,000 troops four miles south of Arklow on the Clonnough river. The Earl of Southampton crossed in deep water with the horse, and the Earl of Ormond led the army over a ford near the sea. The rebels skirmished on the left flank but would not close until they saw the baggage train was vulnerable: they swept into a hard fight and routed the English, killing almost the entire force: "Though the English horse twice drove the Irish back - enabling one of the cavalry captains to rescue the infantry's drums and colours - the small army's morale was beyond help, and it broke and fled in all directions once open country was reached. Many were killed, and the fate of many survivors was little better". Essex marched on to Dublin, arriving on July 2.
After eight weeks Essex could barely muster 300 horsemen. Not a single rebel commander had submitted, and no district was left subdued. Many troops had been dispersed in garrisons in Leinster and Munster, and the strength of the army was much reduced by disease and desertion. In London Essex was further discredited at Court for repairing coastal defences at Waterford and elsewhere, when the Armada scare of that summer was at its height in England.

Essex planned a second offensive beyond the Pale, which went ahead despite the Queen's disapproval: Maryborough and Philipstown (where 60 men had just been lost) were resupplied around July 25 - by Blount and Essex respectively - and Essex fought on the border of Westmeath with the rebel Captain Tyrrell. Harrington took part in this offensive, and Clifford came from the west with reinforcements, only to lose many men in the fighting. A surprise attack on the O'Connors in the heart of their country was successful: their children were exposed to the might of the Crown army, their corn was burned, and 500 cows were seized in thick woods. But Essex had failed once more to engage a significant rebel force and he withdrew to Dublin.

Clifford returned to Connacht, where he was killed and his forces routed at the Battle of Curlew Pass. This defeat - so soon after the defeat of Harrington in Wicklow - was rated by Cecil as the heaviest blow ever suffered by the English in Ireland, and at Court the blame was laid on Essex. O'Neill was now free from threat in the west, and an attack on his territory in Ulster was unlikely. Crown authority in Ireland hung in the balance.

Northern campaign
During the campaign Essex had wilfully abused his power by dubbing 38 knights, and the Queen announced that "it is doubted that if he continues this course he will shortly bring in tag and rag, cut and long-tail, and so bring the order into contempt". But she failed to curtail her commander and, according to her godson Sir John Harington, raged impotently at the news from Ireland: "She walks much in her privy chamber and stamps with her feet at ill news, and thrusts her rusty sword at times into the arras in great rage."  She could take no more and on 30 July 1599 ordered an immediate attack on O'Neill.

Essex agreed and announced his intention, but he was suffering from a recurrent ailment, possibly a kidney stone, which may have restrained his enthusiasm. Others too had misgivings about the Queen's plan, since the rebels were secure on their western front, making an attack from the south deeply hazardous without a base in Lough Foyle. A council of war declared against the plan, but a month later the Queen delivered a furious censure to Essex, complaining bitterly that only 5,000 fighting men were available, and not twice that number. Concerns over a rumoured Spanish landing on the Isle of Wight in England made reinforcement of the Irish army impracticable, while hopes of peace talks with Archduke Albert, the Spanish governor of Flanders, may have caused Essex to suspect treason amongst the Queen's councillors. But seven days after the controversial council of war Essex set out for the north with the hopeless notion that, "if he [O'Neill] has as much courage as he pretendeth we will on one side or the other end the war."

Essex departed Dublin on August 28, and the army was mustered three days later outside Kells, making up 3,700 foot and 300 horse. O'Neill's readiness to outflank him and attack the Pale restrained Essex from advancing further, and in a letter to the Queen ("weary with life") he explained that Kells should be the frontier garrison for the coming winter. On September 2 he marched to Ardee, where O'Neill was sighted with his army on the far side of the Lagan, "a mile and a half from our quarter, but a river and a wood between him and us". The English claimed variously that the rebel leader had 10,000 foot and 1,000 horse, or 5,000 and 700. Heeding counsel not to engage because of the inferiority of his forces, Essex embattled the army and encamped on the left bank of the Lagan. O'Neill marched on the flank, keeping to the woods, while his horse-scouts stayed within sight.

The opposing commanders communicated with each other, and on September 6 Essex advanced with 2,000 foot and 300 horse. On sighting O'Neill he readied his army in the formation of a St Andrew's cross, with cavalry on either flank and to the rear. The war council hoped for an Irish attack and determined not to take the initiative. The next day O'Neill's envoy told Essex his master sought the Queen's mercy, and proposed a meeting with Essex at the ford of Bellaclinthe on the river Glyde.

On September 7 Essex rejected the meeting place, but the impatient O'Neill found a spot to ride into the river up to his horse's belly. It was a gesture of humility, and Essex rode with a troop of horse to an overlooking hill before going down alone to the ford, where he conversed with the rebel for half an hour. Both men withdrew to their companies on the hills. A formal meeting followed later, with six witnesses on either side: Essex rode down to the ford with his men and remained on the bank, while the Irish rode into the river - again, up to their horses' bellies. O'Neill spoke bare-headed for a good while, saluting the viceregal party with great respect. After half-an-hour a further conference was arranged at Lagan ford for the following morning.

Essex continued his march to Drumcondra, while O'Neill returned to camp. At the planned conference on September 8 O'Neill was present, but not Essex. A cessation of arms was agreed for six weeks to six weeks, until May Day, either side being at liberty to break it on giving fourteen days warning; the English had liberty to attack O'Neill's confederates if they refused to be bound. The terms also provided for restitution of all spoils within 20 days after the warning, and the rebels were to hold all they then possessed, with no garrisons to be placed in new stations, free passages to be assured, all English garrisons to be apprised of the cessation, and commissioners for the borders between the English and Irish zones to be appointed. O'Neill was to ratify this on oath, Essex on his word. The terms were committed to writing and signed by O'Neill. The next day Essex dispersed his army and went to take physic at Drogheda, while O'Neill retired with all his forces into the heart of his country.

Flight of Essex
In mid-September 1599 the queen wrote to Essex with further criticisms and forbade him from leaving Ireland without special warrant. A week later he committed responsibility for his government to two lords justice, placing Ormond in command of the army under his old commission, and gave instruction that the cessation was to be maintained, with garrisons fully victualled for six months. On the same day - September 24 - Essex boldly sailed for England, relying on his general warrant to return granted under the Great Seal. He reached London on the 28th, where he disturbed the Queen in her chamber before she was fully dressed.

Elizabeth described the cessation as the, "quick end made of a slow proceeding", and it was generally concluded that Essex's presence in Ireland had been superfluous. Essex revealed only to the Queen what had passed between him and O'Neill, having promised to deliver the rebel request verbally. At first treason was not suspected, but Elizabeth was outspoken about O'Neill: "to trust this traitor upon oath is to trust a devil upon his religion". She ordered no ratification, nor pardon, without her authority; but in time she did admit the usefulness of the cessation. Meanwhile, Essex was committed to custody, and on 29 November the council condemned him in the Star Chamber.

O'Neill was in two minds about the cessation and came under pressure from his confederate, O'Donnell, who argued that too much had been ceded to the English. O'Neill issued a list of demands on religious freedom, withdrawal of English influence, and confirmation of lands in rebel possession - probably the bones of his private conference with Essex. In a report of November 18 the rebels were said to have, "made two Irish terms of scorn against the Earl of Essex; one that he never drew sword but to make knights; the other, that he came like a hasty messenger, that went away before he had done his errand." Later that month there was a further parley on the Lagan, and a one-month extension was agreed. In December O'Neill complained of breaches of the cessation, and in the spring of 1600 he turned south on a campaign through Munster.

Succession
The detail of the earl's private parley with O'Neill became the subject of speculation in England. Sir Henry Wotton, the earl's personal secretary, complained bitterly of the duplicity of interpreters, saying that they were Essex's worst enemies. Rumours of the earl's disloyalty abounded, and with the waning of his favour at court Essex chose to challenge the queen's authority by breaking house arrest and riding in force through London to gain an audience with her. He was compelled to turn back by a well-organised defence, and at Cecil's insistence was declared a traitor. After a swift trial on charges of treason Essex was convicted and suffered the death penalty in February 1601.

Intelligence received in Spain some years later from James Blake (the supposed assassin of O'Donnell) had it "that the Earl of Essex, the same who raided Cadiz, had dealings with the Prince Onel of Ireland about causing a rising against the Queen of England, for which reason he was beheaded in England, and the said Earl employed the deponent [Blake] as intermediary between himself and the said Prince." It was also put about that O'Neill had almost persuaded Essex to leave the service of Queen Elizabeth and to join that of King Philip III to whom, "they would deliver the whole kingdom". O'Neill was said to have promised Essex great favour on behalf of the Spanish king, and when Essex expressed doubt because of, "certain disservices he had done to the Crown of Spain", the rebel leader went so far as to offer Essex his son as a hostage in proof of his good faith.

As with so many late Elizabethan conspiracy theories Spanish calculations may have been of less importance than those of the queen's councillors. At the outset in 1599 Essex had realised he was taking a risk in departing the court and leaving the field open to Cecil, a risk that would pay off only if he defeated O'Neill. The Irish campaign proved far more difficult than anticipated - Essex was the last English commander of the age to underestimate rebel capability - and the situation at court deteriorated rapidly, with Cecil gaining an overwhelming influence over the queen. The private parley with O'Neill was especially significant at a time when Cecil was preparing the succession of the Scots king, James VI, to Elizabeth's throne. Essex's flight from Ireland was a desperate attempt to interfere with those preparations, and once this had failed his subsequent treason was down to his refusal to accept that it was Cecil, and not he, who would determine the succession.

References
Notes

Citations

Sources

Bacon, Francis (1604) Sir Francis Bacon His Apologie, In Certaine Imputations Concerning the Late Earle of Essex
 Vol. 1•Vol. 2
 vol I, 1515-1574 • vol II, 1575-1588 • vol III, 1589–1600 • vol IV, 1601-1603 • vol V, Book of Howth; Miscellaneous • vol VI, 1603–1624  

 [NB For other volumes, see Annals of the Four Masters.]

  

Memoirs of the reign of Queen Elizabeth, from the year 1581 till her death, pp. 394 ff., Thomas Birch ed. (1754).

Nine Years' War (Ireland)
1599 in Ireland
1600 in Ireland